beIN Media Group (/ˈbiːɪn/; Arabic: مجموعة بي إن الإعلامية‎, Majmū‘at Bī’in al-I‘lāmiyyah) is a Qatari state-owned global sport and entertainment network headquartered in Doha, Qatar. beIN distributes entertainment, live sports action, and major international events across 5 continents, in 43 countries, and 7 different languages spanning Europe, North America, Asia, Australia and the Middle East and North Africa (MENA).

History 
beIN Sports was first launched, as a brand, in June 2012 by Al Jazeera Media Network in France. On 1 January 2014, beIN Media Group was established and became the new independent holding company of beIN Sports. In October 2014, it was announced that beIN Media Group had agreed to acquire pay-TV sports channel Setanta Sports Australia, with Setanta being rebranded as beIN Sports Australia.

In 2015, beIN Sports launched an HD channel specially dedicated to football in Spain. The group declared in November 2015 that it would be expanding from sports-only programming to include entertainment and movies as well.

It was announced in January 2016 that beIN Media Group secured an agreement with Turner Broadcasting System, allowing it exclusive rights to broadcast a number of Turner-licensed entertainment and news channels across the Middle East and North Africa. beIN Media Group has since signed strategic partnerships with BBC Studios, Warner Bros., CBS, DreamWorks Animation, and Discovery.

It was rumored in November 2015 that beIN Media Group were interested in purchasing Miramax. On 1 March 2016, beIN Media Group announced its full acquisition of Miramax from Filmyard Holdings. beIN announced they would sell at least 49% of the company in June 2019, with Viacom and Lionsgate as the front-liners.

It was announced in August 2016 that beIN Media Group acquired Turkish pay TV service Digiturk. In November 2019, beIN Media acquired exclusive broadcast rights for the 2019 and 2020 FIFA Club World Cup.

Following the Covid-19 crisis, BeIN is implementing a layoff plan for its activities in the Middle East and North Africa.

Anti-piracy campaign

beoutQ 

In August 2017, beoutQ was launched illegally broadcasting via satellite and streaming over the internet premium sports and entertainment content worth billions of dollars. beIN Media Group has campaigned with leading sporting organizations and broadcasters from around the world to universally condemn piracy operations and call for decisive action to be taken to stamp out beoutQ and stop Saudi-based pay TV provider Arabsat from distributing the illegal broadcast channel.

In October 2018, beIN Media Group launched a $1 billion international arbitration case against Saudi Arabia on the basis of beoutQ. In July 2018, FIFA, the Asian Football Confederation (AFC) and other sports rights holders disclosed that they will be launching legal action in Saudi Arabia.

In December 2018, The World Trade Organization agreed to launch a dispute inquiry to determine whether Saudi Arabia has failed to protect Intellectual Property rights because of beoutQ.

See also 
 beIN Channels Network

References

External links
 

 
Al Jazeera
Mass media companies of Qatar
Mass media companies established in 2014
Mass media in Doha
Companies based in Doha
Qatari companies established in 2014